Minyclupeoides dentibranchialus is an extremely small fish found only in the Mekong Basin in Cambodia.  It is the only species in its genus.

References

Clupeidae
Taxa named by Tyson R. Roberts
Fish of Asia
Fish described in 2008
Monotypic fish genera
Monotypic freshwater fish genera
Monotypic ray-finned fish genera